Frumenta is a genus of moths in the family Gelechiidae.

Species
 Frumenta nephelomicta (Meyrick, 1930)
 Frumenta nundinella (Zeller, 1873)
 Frumenta solanophaga Adamski & Brown, 2002

References

Gnorimoschemini